Cedar Lake is a lake in Aitkin County, Minnesota, in the United States.

Cedar Lake was named from red cedar which grew there.

See also
List of lakes in Minnesota

References

Lakes of Minnesota
Lakes of Aitkin County, Minnesota